Olga Storozhenko (born 14 April 1992) is a Ukrainian actress, model, teacher and beauty pageant titleholder who won Miss Ukraine Universe 2013. Olga later represented Ukraine at Miss Universe 2013 in Moscow, Russia.

Early life
Olga Storozhenko is a senior at the Vinnytsia State Pedagogical University.

Miss Ukraine Universe 2013
Olga Storozhenko from Vinnitsa was crowned Miss Universe Ukraine 2013 by the outgoing queen Anastasia Chernova on 4 September 2013 at Fairmont Grand Hotel in Kyiv. The 21-year-old raven haired beauty was represented Ukraine in Miss Universe 2013 pageant.

Miss Universe 2013
She competed at Miss Universe 2013 where she became the fifth Miss Ukraine to advance to semifinals and finished in the Top 10. The eventual winner was Gabriela Isler of Venezuela.

References

External links
Official Miss Ukraine Universe website

1992 births
Living people
Miss Universe 2013 contestants
People from Vinnytsia Oblast
Ukrainian beauty pageant winners